Operasjon Cobra (Operation Cobra) is a Norwegian thriller film from 1978 directed by Ola Solum. The film is about a Norwegian family living in Fornebu who are held captive in their own home by terrorists. The goal is to have a base near where the US secretary of state will pass during his visit to Norway. The film stars Anders Mordal, Wenche Medbøe, Ingrid Larsen, Roy Bjørnstad and Nils Ole Oftebro. The film is based on the novel Operation Cobra by the Danish writer Anders Bodelsen.

A Danish version of the film was released in 1995.

Plot
The US secretary of state will pay an official visit to Oslo. At the meeting, the Middle East conflict will be discussed, among other matters. The Norwegian police are on full alert, helicopters are circling over the treetops, and terrorist acts are feared against the secretary. A terrorist group that has planned to kill the secretary of state overpowers an innocent family at Fornebu and uses their house as a base for planning the assassination. The inventive son in the house and his two classmates come up with a clever idea to stop the assassination plans. A rocket system called Cobra plays an important role in the drama.

Reception
About the film, the Norwegian Film Institute wrote: "An exciting film that can delight both twelve-year-olds and experienced film viewers, where the Middle East conflict is inserted into a Norwegian context. It addresses terrorism  and violence, and it also tries to provide an explanation."

The newspapers Verdens Gang and Arbeiderbladet gave the film four stars out of six.

Cast

 Anders Mordal as Fredrik 
 Ingrid Larsen as Margarethe 
 Roy Bjørnstad as Fredrik's father
 Nils Ole Oftebro as Jørgen 
 Jo Banoun as Arim's father 
 Svein Erik Brodal as Dan's father 
 Amina Elazemouri as Hanne 
 Noredin Elazemouri as Arim 
 Erik Hivju as the teacher 
 Jorunn Kjellsby as Arim's mother 
 Wenche Medbøe as Fredrik's mother 
 Ola Neegaard Jr. as Dan 
 Ragnhild Nygaard as Dan's mother 
 Liv Thorsen as the police inspector

References

External links
 
 Operasjon Cobra at the National Library of Norway
 Operasjon Cobra at the Swedish Film Database

1978 films
1970s thriller films
Norwegian thriller films
1970s Norwegian-language films